Tim Flach is a British photographer who specialises in studio photography of animals. He has published several books of photographs.

Life 

Flach was born in London, where he works and lives with his wife and son.

Work 

Flach works in a studio in Shoreditch, in the East End of London. Many of his photographs are of captive animals and are taken under highly controlled conditions with the help of a large support team; he sometimes employs techniques more usual in human portraiture. For his book Endangered, published in 2017, he also photographed some wild animals in their natural habitat.

His work has appeared in National Geographic, Creative Review, The New York Times, The Guardian and The New Scientist. He has lectured at various universities, and at institutions such as the Zoological Society of London and the St Petersburg International Economic Forum.

Publications 

 Equus (2008). New York; London: Abrams. 
 Dogs (2010). New York; London: Abrams. 
 More Than Human (2012). New York; London: Abrams.  (text by Lewis Blackwell)
 Evolution (2013). Hamburg: Stern Gruner + Jahr. 
 Endangered (2017). New York: Abrams.  (with Jonathan E.M. Baillie and Sam Wells)

Positions held and awards 
 2013: Honorary Fellowship | British Institute of Professional Photography (BIPP).
 2013: Honorary Doctorate | Norwich University of the Arts, "for services to Photography".
 2013: Honorary Fellow of the Royal Photographic Society (HonFRPS)
 2019 to present: President of the Association of Photographers (AOP)

References

Further reading 

 Tim Flach at YCN. YouCanNow.
 Joe Shute (14 October 2017). Extraordinary photographs that show the human side of endangered animals. The Telegraph. 
 Rose Adams (10 July 2018). Tim Flach invites us to adopt a fresh perspective on wildlife conservation. Tempus. 
 Martin Evening (2015). Photographers at Work: Essential Production Skills for Photographers in Editorial, Design and Advertising. Upper Saddle River: Pearson Education. , page 254.
 Orlando Crowcroft (17 May 2018). The Reasons Why Animals Are Endangered: A Look at Tim Flach's Remarkable Photo Anthology. Newsweek.
 Rachel Segal Hamilton ([n.d.]). Tim Flach's Intimate Portraits Of Endangered Animals. Canon Europe.
 Angus Chen (16 December 2017). Photos: Animals That Could Disappear Because Of Us. National Public Radio.
 Wendyrosie Scott (31 January 2018). Tim Flach's photographic collection asks us to focus on endangered species. The Ecologist.

1958 births
Living people
Photographers from London
Nature photographers
Alumni of Saint Martin's School of Art